Movin' Up may refer to:

 Movin' Up (song), the debut single from Eurodance band Dreamworld
 Movin' Up (album), the debut album for the power pop trio The Elvis Brothers
 Movin' Up!, a 1977 album by organist Don Patterson

See also
 Moving Up, an American reality television series that airs on The Learning Channel
 Moving On Up (disambiguation)
 Moving (disambiguation)